Wonka Biscuits were a type of biscuit manufactured by Nestlé under The Willy Wonka Candy Company brand in the UK.

They came in two varieties: a Golden Cruncher biscuit (similar to McVities Gold) and a chocolate Xploder-based biscuit.

Nestle sold the Wonka confectionery brand to the Ferrero Group in March 2018.

References

The Willy Wonka Candy Company brands